The Best of the First 10 Years – Anniversary Collection is the first compilation album by English-Irish country singer Nathan Carter. It was released in Ireland on 12 November 2020 by Sharpe Music and peaked at number 24 on the Irish Albums Chart.

Background
In October 2020, Carter announced the album on his Twitter account, he said, "I'm delighted to be able to release my new album which will be released on 12th November. This year I’m celebrating a decade on the road and this new release is a celebration of some of my best bits so far. On it, you'll find some new originals & some of my favourite recordings!"

Singles
"Sarah Jane" was released as the lead single from the album on 21 August 2020.

Track listing

Charts

Release history

References

2020 compilation albums
Nathan Carter albums